Milonga del Ángel is a composition of Ástor Piazzolla. It's the second part of the Angel Series, a composition from 1965. He recorded it live in 1965, and then on his 1986 album Tango: Zero Hour.

It's also the name of the 1993 album which contains the following songs: 
 Biyuya
 Revirado
 Caliente
 Lunfardo
 Decarissimo
 Milonga del Ángel
 Muerte del Ángel
 Resurreccion del Ángel
 Tristezas de un Doble A
 Escualo

References

External links
 "piazzolla.org"
 Milonga Del Angel

1965 compositions
Compositions by Ástor Piazzolla